This is a list of episodes for Kaizoku Sentai Gokaiger, the 35th installment of the long running Japanese Super Sentai franchise. As a special anniversary edition, several episodes of Kaizoku Sentai Gokaiger pay a tribute to previous Super Sentai series, titled similarly to said series' episode titles. Examples include episode 5 which follows Tokusou Sentai Dekarangers format of using an English title written in katakana, episodes 11 and 12 which match Samurai Sentai Shinkengers kanji-only titles, and episodes 18 and 29 which follow Bakuryū Sentai Abarangers gimmick of including the word  in the episode title.

Episodes


{| class="wikitable" width="98%"
|- style="border-bottom:8px solid Chocolate"
! width="4%" | Ep# !! Title !! Writer !! Original airdate
|-|colspan="4" bgcolor="#e6e9ff"|

Space Pirates Appear

|-|colspan="4" bgcolor="#e6e9ff"|

The Worth of This Planet

|-|colspan="4" bgcolor="#e6e9ff"|

Changing Courage into Magic

|-|colspan="4" bgcolor="#e6e9ff"|

Blue Pirate Friend 

|-|colspan="4" bgcolor="#e6e9ff"|

Judgment Pirates

|-|colspan="4" bgcolor="#e6e9ff"|

The Most Important Thing

|-|colspan="4" bgcolor="#e6e9ff"|

Niki-Niki! Kenpō Lesson

|-|colspan="4" bgcolor="#e6e9ff"|

Little Spy Tactics

|-|colspan="4" bgcolor="#e6e9ff"|

The Lion, Runs

|-|colspan="4" bgcolor="#e6e9ff"|

Card Game

|-|colspan="4" bgcolor="#e6e9ff"|

The Serious Rebellion

|-|colspan="4" bgcolor="#e6e9ff"|

The Guaranteed Showy Samurai

|-|colspan="4" bgcolor="#e6e9ff"|

Tell Me the Way

|-|colspan="4" bgcolor="#e6e9ff"|

Now More Traffic Safety

|-|colspan="4" bgcolor="#e6e9ff"|

A Privateer Appears

|-|colspan="4" bgcolor="#e6e9ff"|

Clash! Sentai vs. Sentai

|-|colspan="4" bgcolor="#e6e9ff"|

The Awesome Silver Pirate

|-|colspan="4" bgcolor="#e6e9ff"|

The Big Abare With the Dinosaur Robot Drill

|-|colspan="4" bgcolor="#e6e9ff"|

Armor of the 15 Warriors

|-|colspan="4" bgcolor="#e6e9ff"|

The Lost Forest

|-|colspan="4" bgcolor="#e6e9ff"|

The Heart of an Adventure

|-|colspan="4" bgcolor="#e6e9ff"|

A Promise on a Shooting Star

|-|colspan="4" bgcolor="#e6e9ff"|

People's Lives Are the Future of the World

|-|colspan="4" bgcolor="#e6e9ff"|

Foolish Earthlings

|-|colspan="4" bgcolor="#e6e9ff"|

Pirates and Ninjas

|-|colspan="4" bgcolor="#e6e9ff"|

Shushutto The Special

|-|colspan="4" bgcolor="#e6e9ff"|

Switched Gokai Pirates

|-|colspan="4" bgcolor="#e6e9ff"|

Wings Are Eternal

|-|colspan="4" bgcolor="#e6e9ff"|

The Abare Quick-Changing New Combination

|-|colspan="4" bgcolor="#e6e9ff"|

My Friend's Soul

|-|colspan="4" bgcolor="#e6e9ff"|

Crash!! The Secret Operators

|-|colspan="4" bgcolor="#e6e9ff"|

One Power

|-|colspan="4" bgcolor="#e6e9ff"|

It's a Hero!!

|-|colspan="4" bgcolor="#e6e9ff"|

A Dream Come True

|-|colspan="4" bgcolor="#e6e9ff"|

The Other Dimension

|-|colspan="4" bgcolor="#e6e9ff"|

Partner Pirate

|-|colspan="4" bgcolor="#e6e9ff"|

The Strongest Machine

|-|colspan="4" bgcolor="#e6e9ff"|

The Power to Seize Dreams

|-|colspan="4" bgcolor="#e6e9ff"|

Why? We're High School Students

|-|colspan="4" bgcolor="#e6e9ff"|

The Future Is In the Past

|-|colspan="4" bgcolor="#e6e9ff"|

Something I Don't Want to Lose

|-|colspan="4" bgcolor="#e6e9ff"|

The Strongest Man in the Universe

|-|colspan="4" bgcolor="#e6e9ff"|

The Legendary Hero

|-|colspan="4" bgcolor="#e6e9ff"|

A Lovely Christmas Eve

|-|colspan="4" bgcolor="#e6e9ff"|

Confused Ninja

|-|colspan="4" bgcolor="#e6e9ff"|

Hero Eligibility

|-|colspan="4" bgcolor="#e6e9ff"|

The Results of Treason

|-|colspan="4" bgcolor="#e6e9ff"|

The Fated Showdown

|-|colspan="4" bgcolor="#e6e9ff"|

The Greatest Treasure in the Universe

|-|colspan="4" bgcolor="#e6e9ff"|

Day of the Deciding Battle

|-|colspan="4" bgcolor="#e6e9ff"|

Farewell Space Pirates

|}

See also

Notes

References

Kaizoku Sentai Gokaiger